Nenad Trajković is a Serbian poet, essayist, literary critic and translator.

Biography 
Nenad Trajković was born in 1982 in Pirot.

He graduated from Faculty of Law, University of Kragujevac. He has published four collections of poetry, Traces- 2008, I'm Taking You to the Museum - 2011, and Wind From The Tongue - 2016 (The Rade Tomic prize) and Thinner Line Of Infinity - 2019 (9th fb European poetry festival award). His works are published in many major literary magazines and national newspapers. His works were translated into English, Russian, Slovakian, German, French, Polish, Bulgarian, Spanish, Hungarian, Hindi and Macedonian. In 2013 he received a significant recognition by the publishing house "Melnik" in Bulgaria. He got the Rade Tomic Prize for 2015. He lives and works in Vranje in southern Serbia. He is an editor of the International Literary Manifestation Pisanija in Vranje.

Bibliography

Poetry collections 
 Traces 2008, Vranje .
 I'm Taking You to the Museum 2011, Vranjske knjige, Vranje .
 Wind From The Tongue 2016, Istok, Knjazevac, The Rade Tomic prize 
 Thinner Line of Infinity 2019, Banatski kulturni centar

Collections in translations by Trajkovic 
 The Hero of the Forgotten Class (org. Heroj zaboravljene klase), Zvonko Taneski 2017 
 Secret Letters, Slavica Gadžova Sviderska 2018
 The Lord In My Mind, Jovica Tasevski Eternijan 2018

Anthologies 
 Моя сербская антология, Saint Petersburg, Russia, 2018
 World Poetry, Mongolia,2018
 ¿Qué pasa contigo Venezuela?, Venezuela, 2018
 Whispers of Soflay: Yearly Anthology Of Poetry, Pakistan, 2018
 Gracias a la vida, Chile, 2018.
 Од А до Ш / Von A bis Z, 9th centuries of Serbian poetry, bilingual edition in German and Serbian language, 2017.
 Between Two Worlds, Niš, 2012.
 Arte Versus, Belgrade, 2013.
 A Soaring Street, Inđija, 2014.
 My Love, I Am Calling You With a Longing, Mrkonjić Grad, 2014.
 Lepenicko Djurdjevdarje, Kragujevac, 2015.

Literary magazines

Awards 
 Publishing House Melnik, Bulgaria - 2013.
 The Rade Tomic Prize, Serbia - 2015
 Campionatul Mondial de Poezie, special prize by the jury, Sinaia, Romania, 2018
 European FB festival, 2018

References

External links 
 

1982 births
Living people
21st-century Serbian poets
People from Pirot
Serbian literary critics
Serbian male essayists
Serbian male poets
Serbian translators
University of Kragujevac alumni
21st-century translators